The Nottingham Emmanuel School is a coeducational Church of England secondary school and sixth form with academy status, located near the banks of the river Trent in West Bridgford, Nottinghamshire, England. It is next to the former Great Central Main Line in the borough of Rushcliffe.

History
The School began in September 2002 and has been using the old Wilford Meadows building until the arrival of its completed 'new build' in late 2008. The first 6th-form students began their A-Levels in September 2007.

In 2000 a project group was established to plan a programme of consultation, including a range of feasibility studies. There was very strong support from parents for the development of another Church school and this proposal was also supported nationally through the recommendations made in the Dearing Report for new Church Aided Schools to be established. In 2001 a temporary Governing body was convened to set up the School.

The Nottingham Emmanuel School was so named because it reflects faith in God. The Governors realised that a specifically Christian spiritual ethos in which other faith traditions were hosted within an Anglican framework was crucial to the overall purpose. This is reflected in the School's Admission Policy.

The School celebrated its official opening in 2002 with 180 students and is now full in Years 7, 8, 9, 10 and 11. In September 2006 the school welcomed their fifth year of intake and this meant students for the first time were entered for public examinations at Key Stage 4. The school has a planned full size of 1150 students, including the Sixth Form in 2008/9.

The school converted to academy status on 1 June 2013.

Previous schools
The true origins of the school, in a convoluted and chequered history, start with the Mundella Grammar School, on Colygate Road in the Meadows, which opened in 1899. The school's name came from Anthony John Mundella, a Liberal MP for Sheffield, and Sheffield Brightside. During the war, from September 1939-March 1940, the school was evacuated to Stamford, Lincolnshire. This became a comprehensive in the 1970s, keeping its former name. These school buildings were demolished in 1985. The school transferred to the Roland Green Comprehensive School, which became the Wilford Meadows School. Due to its low results, this school was closed, and has now re-opened as the Nottingham Emmanuel School.

Academic performance

The school gets above average results for Nottingham at GCSE, and A Levels. Nottingham LEA gets the lowest results in the East Midlands.

The uniform is a white shirt, black blazer with the new 'NES' logo, and a purple tie which has two stripes to representative of the students' houses.

Pastoral care

Form tutors
Each Tutor Group of mixed ability students is attached to a Year Group and a House. The Tutor Group of approximately 30 students has its own Form Tutor who is supported by two Assistant Tutors from Year 10. The Form Tutor is responsible for supporting the students in their care in all aspects of their school life – academic, social and personal. They will be closely monitoring their academic progress in the National Curriculum through teacher assessment data and their rewards and behaviour record through the online school’s information management system. Advice and guidance can be given over any matter which might affect the individual’s work and personal development. The Form Tutor is the first point of contact for parents and students over any matter relating to school life and normally stays with their tutor group from Year 7 – 11 to ensure continuity of pastoral care and support throughout their school career.

Achievement and pastoral managers
All of the Tutor Groups and Form Tutors are managed by the Achievement and Pastoral Manager. This person is responsible for co-ordinating the work of the Year group and monitoring overall academic progress. They co-ordinate intervention programmes and ensure that the whole year group work together effectively and maintain high standards of behaviour. The Achievement and Pastoral Manager is available to support parents and tutors in more serious matters of concern relating to any aspect of school life or when initial attempts to resolve issues with the tutor or subject teacher have not been successful.

Heads of house
The Nottingham Emmanuel School has a house system the houses are represented by colours: Red, Blue, Yellow and Green.
This changed in Sept 2017 to King Jnr (Green), Romero (Red), Pullinger (Yellow) and Booth (Blue) following a vote by students and staff of the respective houses.

Special educational needs
The SENCo is responsible for the leadership and management of Special Educational Needs provision across the School. Specialist support for students is identified in collaboration with staff and parents and where appropriate, outlined in a student tracking document which details the SEN profile of the student and tracks academic progress against agreed targets. This enables students and staff to work collectively on specific targets that can be monitored on a regular basis.

Senior leadership
 Mrs S. Stapleton: Principal

Notable former pupils

Mundella Grammar School
 Edwin Brown CBE, President of the National Association of Nursery and Family Care from 1984–88
 Prof Jonathan Chambers, Professor of Economic and Social History at the University of Nottingham from 1958–64
 Peter Hackett OBE, Principal of the Camborne School of Mines from 1970–94, and President of the Institution of Mining and Metallurgy from 1989–90
 Prof Raymond Kirk, Professor of Surgery at University College London Medical School since 2004, and President of the Hunterian Society from 1995-6, and of the Medical Society of London from 1988-9
 John Mackay, Chairman of The Headmasters' and Headmistresses' Conference from 1970-1
 Edward Middleditch, artist
 Cecil Roberts, novelist
 John Savage, Chairman and Managing Director of Boots from 1954–61
 Doug Scott, mountaineer
 Fred Simpson, Labour MP for Ashton-under-Lyne from 1935-9
 Peter Stephens, Editor of the News of the World from 1974-5
 David Pleat, football player, manager and commentator
 Stephen Lowe, playwright
 Rae Woodland, soprano

The Nottingham Emmanuel School
 Rosie Bentham, actress
 Mary Earps, footballer

External links
 EduBase
 Former Mundella School

Secondary schools in Nottingham
Educational institutions established in 2002
Church of England secondary schools in the Diocese of Southwell and Nottingham
2002 establishments in England
Academies in Nottingham